Gerald B. Palmer (July 23, 1930 – May 6, 1984) was a Canadian football player who played for the Winnipeg Blue Bombers and BC Lions. He played college football at the University of Toledo, where he earned a degree in business administration in 1952.

References

1930 births
1984 deaths
American football halfbacks
Canadian football running backs
African-American players of American football
African-American players of Canadian football
Toledo Rockets football players
Winnipeg Blue Bombers players
BC Lions players
Sportspeople from Toledo, Ohio
Players of American football from Ohio
20th-century African-American sportspeople